The Spanish Bachelor's Degree in Law is the university academic degree conferred on those who have successfully completed a legal study process at a university. It is not the same as the Bachelor of Laws.

Spain offers types of Bachelor's Degree in Law. One applies the Bologna Process and required 5 years of study with specialization and without legal internship. The later degree consumes 4 years, with internship and to specialize it is necessary to study a master's degree.

Before Bologna 

The bachelor's degree in Law for the Bologna Process was called Licenciatura en Derecho, it was an academic licentiate degree, a degree below that of a PhD. It was equivalent to a Master's degree in the anglophone system.

A Licenciatura typically required from 4 to 6 years of university courses, and had a typical credit workload of 300 to 400 credits. It required 5 years of university courses, and was established in 1953.

With the Bologna Process this licentiate degree was phased out at Spanish universities and was replaced by the system of the Grado (Bachelor's Degree, same name) and Master.

Prior to the Bologna Process, the master's degree was not considered an official academic degree in Spain, as the transition from undergraduate to postgraduate studies could only be done directly from a Licenciatura to doctoral studies.

After Bologna 

The Bologna Process established the system of the Grado and Master, earning the same academic level as the licentiate degree, but in two different degrees. The bachelor's degree in Law is called Grado en Derecho and requires 4 years of university courses.

This degree includes an optional legal internship (each university chooses in its degree planning), which is usually 6 ECTS credits.

Degree planning and Study Plan 

The degree planning of the bachelor's degree in Law includes (in the Autonomous University of Barcelona for example):

1st course 
 Law Theory
 History of Law and Institutions
 Roman Law
 Introduction to Economics
 Civil Law I
 Constitutional Organisation of the State
 Constitutional Law I
 Criminal Law I
 Criminal Law II

2nd course 
 Civil Law II
 Civil Law III
 Criminal Law III
 Administrative Law I
 Administrative Law II
 European Union Law
 Public International Law
 Commercial Law I
 Constitutional Law II

3rd course 
 Commercial Law II
 Civil Law IV
 Finance Law and Tax Law I
 Finance Law and Tax Law II
 Procedural Law I
 Procedural Law II
 Employment and Social Security Law I
 Employment and Social Security Law II
 Administrative Law III

4th course 
 Private International Law
 International Protection of Human Rights
 Legal Internship
 Bachelor's Degree Final Project

References 

Law degrees
Academic degrees of Spain
Bachelor's degrees
Master's degrees
Educational policies and initiatives of the European Union
Law schools in Spain
Educational programs by nation
University programs